The Sky's the Limit was a United Kingdom game show first broadcast on 11 July 1970, being a travel-themed version of Double Your Money. The show was hosted by Hughie Green and co-hosted by Monica Rose, Audrey Graham and Katya Wyeth.

The contestants had to answer questions based on their specialist subject, with every set of answers increasing their prize fund. In the first round, contestants answered questions increasing in value from £1 up to £100. They then had to answer a special question to qualify for the further rounds.

Further rounds involved contestants being seated in a 'soundproof box'. After the first round questions contained subsequently more parts, so that on the final round the question was a five-part question - all parts had to be answered correctly in each round. The top prize was 21,000 miles of travel and £600 spending money. It was last broadcast on 5 July 1974.
The Director was Royston Mayoh and the producer Peter Holmans.

External links

1970s British game shows
1971 British television series debuts
1974 British television series endings
Television series by Yorkshire Television